The MP-443 Grach or "PYa", for "Pistolet Yarygina ("Yarygin Pistol"), following traditional Russian naming procedure, is the Russian standard military-issue side arm.

The development was headed by the designer . It was developed under designation "Grach" in response to Russian military trials, which began in 1993. In 2003, it was adopted as a standard sidearm for all branches of Russian military and law enforcement, alongside the Makarov PM, GSh-18, and SPS.

Design details

The PYa is a high-capacity, double-action, short-recoil semi-automatic pistol. Barrel/slide locking is a simplified Colt–Browning design, similar to that found in many modern pistols (for example the SIG Sauer and Glock families of pistols); the breech end of the barrel is rectangular in shape, rather than rounded, and fits into matching locking grooves within the slide, near the ejection port. The slide stop lever can be mounted on either side of the weapon to accommodate both left- and right-handed users. Likewise, the manual safety is ambidextrous, with safety catches on both sides of the weapon, where it is manipulated by the thumb. It is mounted on the frame, below the rear slide grooves, and directly behind the slide stop lever. The hammer is partially concealed at the sides to prevent catching on clothes and equipment. The magazine release catch is located in the base of the trigger guard on the left side, where it can be manipulated with the thumb (right-handed users) or index or middle finger (left-handed users). The front sight is formed as a fixed part of the slide and is non-adjustable. The back sight is drift adjustable for windage (dovetail type), but this requires a tool. Both feature white contrast elements to ease aiming in low-light conditions. The standard magazine capacity is 17 rounds, fed from a double-column, two position feed magazine. Magazines with an 18-round capacity were produced after 2004.

Though the grips of the pistol are polymer, the weapon is largely made of metal (stainless steel for the barrel, carbon steel for the frame and slide).

It is chambered for the 9×19mm 7N21 cartridge, the Russian loading of the ubiquitous 9mm NATO pistol cartridge, which is broadly equivalent to NATO standard loadings, loaded to comparable pressure specifications. The 7N21 features a semi-armour-piercing bullet with a tempered steel core. The weapon can also use standard 9×19mm Parabellum/9mm Luger/9×19mm NATO cartridges, including civilian loads such as hollowpoints for law enforcement (only full metal jacket bullets are permitted for use in military weapons).

Adoption in Russia 
As of 2008, it was supplied only in small numbers to selected special forces units, presumably those in the North Caucasus.

In October 2008 the Russian interior minister planned to equip more Russian police with PYa pistols. But due to financial problems and the fact the Makarov pistol is so plentiful in Russia, the Makarov remains as primary police service pistol in Russia.

Mass production started in 2011. Officers of the Western Military District received weapons in 2012. Scouts of the intelligence compound, belonged to the Central Military District and stationed in Siberia, fully rearmed on Yarygin pistols in early 2015.

The massive deliveries of PYa pistols to the Russian Armed Forces started in 2012. As of early 2016, several thousand of such handguns have been supplied. Officers are training to master the new firearms. Nevertheless, the PM pistol have not been brought out of service. It supposedly will have been finally replaced by PYas by 2019.

Variants
 MP-446 Viking: a civilian market version. It has a magazine capacity of 17 or 18 rounds. It is an identical pistol, except it is not designed to take high-powered +P and +P+ rounds like the 9×19mm 7N21.  10-round magazines are available.
 MP-446C Viking: a civilian market version designed for competition.
 MP-353: civilian market version, non-lethal pistol which fire only ammunition with rubber bullets.
 MP-472: non-lethal pistol

Accessories 
 "крепление Б-8" - dismountable Weaver rail mount
 "2КС+ЛЦУ мини-Клещ" - Combination gun-mounted tactical light and laser sight which can be mounted below the barrel.

Users 

 : Used by the Armenian Army, National Security Service and the Police.
 : Since 2007 used as service pistol in private security companies.
 : In 2003 it was adopted as a standard sidearm for all branches of Armed Forces of the Russian Federation; fielding continues as of 2021. Since September 2006 used as a pistol in law enforcement, though it never fully replaced the Makarov PM. It is adopted as a standard sidearm for special police units (SOBR) and rapid response units of riot police (OMON). As of 2015, it is the service pistol of the Russian Airborne Troops. Since 2018 it is supplied to the National Guard of Russia.

See also
List of Russian weaponry
CZ 99
Udav

References

Notes

Sources 
 Оружие, которое нам выбирают. // журнал "Мастер-ружьё", № 54, 2001. стр.54-58
 Ireneusz Chloupek. Następca Makarowa. // „Komandos”. nr 11 (109), 2001. str. 71-75.
 Ю. Пономарёв. Новобранец «Ярыгин» // журнал «Калашников. Оружие, боеприпасы, снаряжение» № 6, 2003. стр.6-14

External links

Izhevsk Mechanical Plant (MP-443 Grach)
Izhevsk Mechanical Plant (MP-446 Viking)
Instruction manual (MP-446 Viking)
Modern Firearms (MP-443 Grach)
Modern Firearms (MP-446 Viking)
Army Recognition

Semi-automatic pistols of Russia
9mm Parabellum semi-automatic pistols
Izhevsk Mechanical Plant products
Police weapons